Salamanca F.C. is a Mexican football club based in Salamanca, Guanajuato, México which is playing in the Tercera División de México.

History
The club was founded in the 1950s and soon after, in 1958, the club joined the Segunda División de México and played under the name of Mapaches. The club played in the second division until 1961 when the club folded due to economic problems. In 1964 the club rejoined the second division; this time the club was owned by a local oil company which brought in big name players but never achieved a promotion to the first division. From 1964 the club would go on to play good to mediocre tournaments which finally came to an end once again in 1986 when the club folded and would not come this time for several years all time times playing under the name of Petroleros de Salamanca.

Awaited Return
In 2001 the same oil company that had owned the club in the 1980s started up several professional clubs, the first a basketball club in 2001 which played under the name of Petroleros de Salamanca. In 2004 the football club finally made its return, quickly joining the Primera A. In 2006 the club reached its first final in the Primera A only to lose it to Puebla FC in a Penalty shoot out. The club would go on to play six more tournaments before the club was sold and relocated in La Piedad, Michoacán, where it became C.F. La Piedad.

Failed Return to Liga Premier
After spending several years in the Third Division of Mexico without winning promotion, on July 3, 2019 the team managed to return to the Liga Premier de México (Second Division) with Serie B being their new category, this after reaching an agreement with the Real Potosino's management so that the team will move from San Luis Potosí City to Salamanca, adopt the name of the town and thus return second division football to the city of Salamanca. Finally on July 18, 2019 the Mexican Football Federation did not grant the guarantee for this change and Salamanca remained at Liga TDP.

In 2020 due to financial problems, the club's board of directors rented its franchise to the Barajas Soccer Promoter, based in Tamazula de Gordiano, Jalisco. 

In 2022 the team returned to participate in the professional leagues, being renamed C.F. Salamanca and based on the franchise Jaral del Progreso F.C.

Return to Liga Premier
On January 27, 2023 Catedráticos Elite F.C. was relocated from Ameca, Jalisco to Salamanca, Guanajuato. The relocation of the club occurred after a merger with Petroleros de Salamanca, because the local oil sector was interested in having a professional team in the city, for this reason the team was unofficially called Catedráticos Petroleros.

Badge
In the early 1950s clubs usually used their city's crest as their own, so Salamanca used the city crest from 1958-1961. In the early 1970s the club used a crest which had an oil rig along with a soccer ball. In 2004 the club returned with a brand new crest but kept the oil rig and the soccer ball along with the club's colors.

First kit evolution

Season to season

 Has Played 26 2nd Division Tournaments last in April 2010.
 Has Played 9 Primera A Tournaments last in 2009.
 Has Played 7 3rd División seasons since August 2013.

Players

Current squad

Honours

Professional
Primera División A: (0)
Runner-up (1): Apertura 2006

Segunda División: (1)
Champion : 1951-1952

Segunda División "B": (2)
Champion : 1984-1985, 1993-1994

Notable former players
  Armado Segura
  Sebastiã do Nascimento
  Felipe Flores
   Ramiro Omar Jorge
  David Jimenez
  Fausto Ruíz
  Martín Navarro

See also
Estadio Sección XXIV

References

External links
Official Club site

Football clubs in Guanajuato
Association football clubs established in 1958
1958 establishments in Mexico